The 2008–09 season was the 91st season in the history of U.S. Lecce and the club's first season back in the top flight of Italian football. In addition to the domestic league, Lecce participated in this season's edition of the Coppa Italia. The season covered the period from 1 July 2008 to 30 June 2009.

Players

First-team squad

Transfers

In

Out

Pre-season and friendlies

Competitions

Overall record

Serie A

League table

Results summary

Results by round

Matches

Coppa Italia

Statistics

Goalscorers

References 

U.S. Lecce seasons
Lecce